Costamagna is an Italian surname. Notable people with the surname include:

Alejandra Costamagna (born 1970), Chilean writer and journalist
Carlo Costamagna (1881–1965), Italian lawyer and academic 
Claudio Costamagna (born 1956), Italian banker

Italian-language surnames